Reza Bazargan (born 1931, died between 2006 and 2010) was an Iranian alpine skier. He competed in three events at the 1956 Winter Olympics.

References

1931 births
Year of death missing
Iranian male alpine skiers
Olympic alpine skiers of Iran
Alpine skiers at the 1956 Winter Olympics
Place of birth missing